John Robert Adams Hine was an English professional footballer who played as a right half in the Football League for Ashington.

Personal life 
Hine served as a company quartermaster sergeant in the Lincolnshire Regiment and the Durham Light Infantry during the First World War.

References 

English footballers
English Football League players
Place of death missing
British Army personnel of World War I
Year of death missing
Ashington A.F.C. players
1895 births
Footballers from Tyne and Wear
Association football wing halves
Durham Light Infantry soldiers

Royal Lincolnshire Regiment soldiers